Ilja Keizer (née Laman; born 26 February 1944) is a retired middle-distance runner from the Netherlands. She competed at the 1968 and 1972 Summer Olympics in the 800 m and 1500 m, respectively, and finished in sixth place in 1972.

In 1970 and 1972, Keizer-Laman was selected as the Dutch female athlete of the year. Her personal bests were 2:02.2 in the 800 m (1968) and 4:05.13 in the 1500 m (1972).

References

1944 births
Living people
Athletes (track and field) at the 1968 Summer Olympics
Athletes (track and field) at the 1972 Summer Olympics
Dutch female middle-distance runners
Olympic athletes of the Netherlands
People from Velsen
Sportspeople from North Holland
20th-century Dutch women
21st-century Dutch women